Roger W. Robinson (July 22, 1909 – November 11, 2010) was an American cardiologist who served as Chief of Cardiology and Chief of Medicine at Memorial Hospital, Worcester, MA.  He was the director of the Lipid Research Laboratory and served as a professor at the University of Massachusetts Medical School. He is considered a pioneer in the field of lipid and atherosclerosis research.

Early life and career

Dr. Robinson was born in Buffalo, NY on July 22, 1909 to William W. and Anna (Hoover) Robinson. He graduated Northwestern University Medical School (Chicago) in 1935 and completed his post graduate training in medicine at Peter Bent Brigham Hospital (now Brigham and Women’s hospital) in Boston, MA. He joined Memorial Hospital in Worcester, MA in 1939 and served there in various roles over the ensuing 50 years. He served as an Army physician during World War II, as Chief of Cardiology and subsequently as Chief of Medicine at UMass Memorial Medical Center. His own private fund raising campaign led to the creation of the Lipid Research Laboratory at Memorial, which he also directed until his retirement in 1989.
He was a professor at the University of Massachusetts Medical School, which he helped bring to Worcester.

Career in medicine

Since his early years at Memorial Hospital and despite the lack of a laboratory or paid staff, Dr. Robinson engaged in research. Over the years, research funding from private and government funds, led to the development of a large research team with access to advanced lipid research equipment. Dr. Robinson recognized the role of cholesterol and diet in atherosclerotic heart disease and demonstrated that heparin prevents arterial clots.
His research led to the identification of lipid-lowering effects of the female hormone estrogen and he performed the earliest studies of estrogen supplementation in men and post-menopausal women. Dr. Robinson also conducted research on strokes; his 20-year follow-up study of 1000 stroke patients is still the largest published research on the natural history of strokes.

Willard House and Clock Museum

Dr. Robinson, along with his wife Imogene, co-founded The Willard House and Clock Museum in Grafton, which he served as President and Chairman of the Trustees. The museum was created through Dr. Robinson’s generosity and successful fund raising efforts, as well as his wife’s vision and more than 20 years of love and dedication to the museum’s daily operation. Even while still working in medicine Dr. Robinson would greet guests and give tours at the Willard Museum.

Death and legacy
Dr. Roger W Robinson died at home on November 11, 2010. 
The Roger W. Robinson Fund was created in his memory. The Fund has supported work in cardiovascular research, endocrinology, hematology and headache research and has helped purchase important laboratory equipment.  An annual lecture series on Cardiovascular Disease continues today, in gratitude for his many contributions to the training of generations of medical students and house officers.

References

1909 births
2010 deaths
American cardiologists
University of Massachusetts Medical School faculty
Feinberg School of Medicine alumni